Baryshevo is a rural locality on Karelian Isthmus, in Vyborgsky District of Leningrad Oblast. It is situated on the southern shore of Vuoksi River. Until the Winter War and Continuation War, it had been the administrative center of the Äyräpää municipality of the Viipuri Province of Finland.

See also
Battle of Vuosalmi

Rural localities in Leningrad Oblast
Karelian Isthmus